Paul Storz Tenement is a habitation building located at 81 Gdańska Street, in Bydgoszcz, Poland. The edifice is registered on the Kuyavian-Pomeranian Voivodeship Heritage List.

Location 
The building stands on the western side of Gdańska Street, between Cieszkowskiego and Świętojańska streets.

It stands close to remarkable tenements in the same street:
 Alfred Schleusener Tenement at 62;
 Józef Święcicki tenement at 63;
 Eduard Schulz Tenement at 66/68;
 Tenement at 71 Gdańska street;
 Tenement at 75 Gdańska street;
 Ernst Bartsch tenement at 79.

History
Building was constructed in 1897, for Paul Storz, a master carpenter.

At the time, the location of the building was 47a Danzigerstrasse, Bromberg.

The adjacent tenement at Nr.83, built in 1890 and following the same eclecticism style, has been owned by Carl Rose, designer of houses in the same street (16 Gdańska Street and 51 Gdańska Street).

Architecture
The building was built following Eclecticism forms and elements of Mannerism.

The facade is decorated with stylized cartouches. Above first floor windows are placed panels with putto heads: this adornment was at the time a manifest against typical ornament rule.

Second floor windows are topped with classical pediments, and third floor windows are festooned on their side by pilasters topped with expressive masks.

The building has been put on the Kuyavian-Pomeranian Voivodeship Heritage List Nr.601311 Reg.A/1056, on February 26, 1997.

Gallery

See also

 Bydgoszcz
 Gdanska Street in Bydgoszcz
  Downtown district in Bydgoszcz

References

Bibliography
  

Cultural heritage monuments in Bydgoszcz
Buildings and structures on Gdańska Street, Bydgoszcz
Residential buildings completed in 1897